The Hawaii ōō (Moho nobilis) is a member of the extinct genus of the ōōs (Moho) within the extinct family Mohoidae. It was previously regarded as member of the Australo-Pacific honeyeaters (Meliphagidae).

Description
 
 
The Hawaii ōō was first described by Blasius Merrem in 1786. The colour of its plumage was glossy black with a brown shading at the belly. It was further characterized by yellowish tufts at the axillaries. It had some yellowish plumes on its rump, but lacked yellow thigh feathers like the Bishop's ʻōʻō, and also lacked the whitish edgings on its tail feathers like the Oʻahu ʻōʻō. It had the largest yellow plumes on its wings out of all the species of ōō. The name of the cinder cone Puʻu ʻŌʻō is often translated as "Hill of the Ōō-Bird", referring to this species.

Extinction
At the time of the arrival by Europeans, it was still relatively common on the Big Island, but its decline followed rapidly afterwards. Its striking plumage was already used for aahu alii (robes), ahu ula (capes), and kāhili (feathered staffs) of alii (Hawaiian nobility) by Native Hawaiians; they captured the Hawaii ōō, carefully plucking its feathers a few at a time, before releasing the live bird back into the wild. Europeans also saw the striking beauty of the bird, but collected its feathers in a lethal manner, hunting many of them for specimens in personal collections. Some were even caught and put in cages to be sold as songbirds, only to live for a few days or weeks before diseases from mosquitoes befell them. The decline of this bird was hastened by both natives and Europeans by the introduction of the musket, which allowed hunters and collectors to shoot birds down from a distance, from great heights, and in great numbers. As late as 1898, hunters were still able to kill over a thousand individuals in one hunt, but after that year, the Hawaii ōō population declined rapidly. The birds became too rare to be shot in any great quantities, but continued to be found for nearly 30 years. 

Despite records of mass hunting, collection seemed to only play a minor role in the species' extinction, and mosquito-borne diseases and deforestation probably were the major reasons for its extinction (very similar to the other members of its genus). The last known sighting was in 1934 on the slopes of Mauna Loa.

See also
 Kauai ʻoʻo
 Oahu ʻoʻo
 Bishop's ʻoʻo

References

External links
 3D view  of specimens RMNH 110.044 and RMNH 110.045 (formerly RMNH 2142) at Naturalis, Leiden (requires QuickTime browser plugin).

Endemic birds of Hawaii
Extinct birds of Hawaii
Moho (genus)
Bird extinctions since 1500
Birds described in 1786
Taxa named by Blasius Merrem